Matsuoka Guitar (formerly Matsuoka Musical Instruments Co., Ltd.) was a Japanese manufacturer of guitars in Nagoya, Japan.

Self taught luthier Ryoji Matsuoka began making guitars following World War 2 as the popularity of enka music helped introduce more Japanese to the guitar. After about a decade of refining his skill, he established Matsuoka Musical Instruments Co., Ltd. in 1959. Matsuoka is a boutique firm specializing in well made classical guitars for entry to mid level players.

Influenced by luthiers such as Hauser, Kohno, and Ramírez, Matsuoka produced guitars for Aria and Ibanez in the 1960s and 1970s, and produced his own line starting in the early 1970s. Up to the early 80’s Ryoji Matsuoka himself handcrafted the top of the line (Mastercraft) models for Ibanez.

Matsuoka's son Toshiaki followed in his father's as a luthier and oversaw the day-to-day operations of the company until its dissolution in 2014.

References

Classical guitar makers
Musical instruments brands
Japanese brands
Guitar manufacturing companies
Manufacturing companies established in 1959
Manufacturing companies based in Nagoya
Musical instrument manufacturing companies of Japan